Hans Marsilius Purrmann (April 10, 1880 – April 17, 1966) was a German artist. He was born in Speyer where he also grew up. He completed an apprenticeship as a scene painter and interior decorator, and subsequently studied in Karlsruhe and Munich before going to Paris in 1906. It was here he became a student and later a friend of Henri Matisse whom he set  up a painting school with.  After 1916, Purrmann lived in Berlin and Langenargen (Lake Constance), moving from there in 1935 to run the German art foundation at the Villa Romana in Florence. He lived there until 1943, then in Montagnola (Switzerland). He died in Basel. Typical of Purrmann's style are colourful, sensitively painted landscapes, still lifes and portraits. There are large collections of his works in Langenargen Museum and in the Purrmann House, Speyer.

External links
 Website covering Hans Purrmann (in German; run by the Hans Purrmann Archive): http://www.purrmann.com/
 
 Hans Purrmann High School in Speyer, Germany: http://www.hpg-speyer.de
 Purrmann House, info, opening hours https://web.archive.org/web/20070808003950/http://www.speyer.de/de/tourist/museen/purrmann

1880 births
1966 deaths
19th-century German painters
19th-century German male artists
German male painters
20th-century German painters
20th-century German male artists
Modern painters
People from Speyer
People from the Palatinate (region)
Recipients of the Pour le Mérite (civil class)
Knights Commander of the Order of Merit of the Federal Republic of Germany